...And Here I Die... Satisfied is an EP by Swedish death metal band Grave, released in February, 1993 on Century Media Records.

"Black Dawn" is a re-recording of the title track from their 1987 demo when they were known as Corpse.

Track listing

Personnel
Grave
 Jörgen Sandström - Vocals, Guitars, Bass
 Ola Lindgren - Guitars, Backing vocals
 Jens "Jensa" Paulsson - Drums
 Jonas Torndal - Bass (Tracks 4 - 6)
Production
 Axel Hermann - Cover art

References

Grave (band) EPs
1994 EPs
Century Media Records EPs